Each winner of the 1973 Governor General's Awards for Literary Merit was selected by a panel of judges administered by the Canada Council for the Arts.

Winners

English Language
Fiction: Rudy Wiebe, The Temptations of Big Bear.
Poetry or Drama: Miriam Mandel, Lions at her Face.
Non-Fiction: Michael Bell, Painters in a New Land.

French Language
Fiction: Réjean Ducharme, L'hiver de force.
Poetry or Drama: Roland Giguère, La main au feu.
Non-Fiction: Albert Faucher, Québec en Amérique au XIXe siècle.

Governor General's Awards
Governor General's Awards
1973 literary awards